Salisbury Island (also known as Salsbury Island) is an island in the Old River, in the Sacramento–San Joaquin River Delta. It is named after its original owner, tugboat operator Leslie Salsbury, who purchased it in 1945. It is in Contra Costa County, in northern California.

References

Islands of Contra Costa County, California
Islands of the Sacramento–San Joaquin River Delta
Islands of Northern California